SAL - Sociedade de Aviação Ligeira was an air taxi operator based in Luanda, Angola.

History 

Founded in 1992, by a partnership between TAAG and Endiama, for light civil aviation in Angola, such as air taxi and other activities. It had 64 flight personnel, 65 maintenance personnel and 54 commercial and office support personnel.

Fleet 
As of January 2008 it had, according to its website:

Beechcraft Super King Air these include 3 - 200 Super King Air and 2 - 350 Super King Air
4 Cessna 208 Caravan
1 Short SC.7 Skyvan

Bases 

Benguela
Cabinda
Luanda
Lubango
Namibe (now Moçâmedes)

References

External links
Former website (archived 24 June 2013)

Companies based in Luanda
Defunct airlines of Angola
Airlines established in 1992
1992 establishments in Angola